Bekasovo is the name of several rural localities in Russia:
Bekasovo, Kaluga Oblast, a village in Yukhnovsky District of Kaluga Oblast
Bekasovo, Moscow Oblast, a village under the administrative jurisdiction of the Town of Naro-Fominsk in Naro-Fominsky District of Moscow Oblast